Henry Richardson Camnitz (October 26, 1884 – January 6, 1951) was a pitcher in Major League Baseball. He played briefly for the Pittsburgh Pirates and St. Louis Cardinals. He also compiled a 99–88 career record in eight seasons in the Minor Leagues, including 27 wins for the McKeesport Tubers in 1909. He was the brother of Howie Camnitz, also a pitcher in the Major Leagues.

References

External links

1884 births
1951 deaths
People from Lincoln County, Kentucky
Baseball players from Kentucky
Major League Baseball pitchers
Pittsburgh Pirates players
New Castle Nocks players
McKeesport Tubers players
Jersey City Skeeters players
Youngstown Steelmen players
Centre Colonels baseball players
Lexington Colts players
Columbus Foxes players
Petersburg Goobers players
Savannah Colts players